Rhys Davies (born 28 May 1985) is a Welsh professional golfer.

Davies was born in Edinburgh, Scotland, but has lived in Wales for the majority of his life.  He played collegiate golf in the United States at East Tennessee State University where he won ten times and was a first team All-American in 2005, 2006, and 2007. He played on two Walker Cup teams (2005 and 2007), and for Europe in four Palmer Cup teams (2004, 2005, 2006, 2007). Davies was second in the World Amateur Golf Ranking (May 2007), before turning pro in September 2007.

Davies successfully came through the Asian Tour's qualifying school, allowing him to play on that tour for the 2008 season.

Davies won twice on the Challenge Tour in 2009 and finished fourth on the Challenge Tour Rankings to earn his European Tour card for 2010. He won his first European Tour title at the 2010 Trophée Hassan II. At the 2010 Celtic Manor Wales Open, he shot a final round 62 to set the course record on his way to finishing as runner-up. This performance elevated Davies into the top 50 of the Official World Golf Ranking for the first time. He finished the season ranked 18th on the European Tour Order of Merit. After a poor 2012 season, Davies narrowly failed to maintain his full playing rights for the 2013 season.

Davies earned his first professional win in five years at the 2015 Turkish Airlines Challenge, and followed this three months later with victory at the Challenge de Espana, when he opened with a first round 60. These successes helped Davies secure eighth position on the Challenge Tour order of merit, and full European Tour status.

To date Davies has played 314 tournaments (5 wins; 9 second; 8 third and 43 top ten places); 981 rounds; 70,165 strokes; 71.52 stroke average. These include 170 European Tour tournaments (1 win; 4 second; 2 third and 12 top ten places), and 6 Majors (Oakmont; Turnberry; Pebble Beach; St Andrews; Whistling Straits; and Royal St Georges).

At sixteen Davies had to choose between cricket and golf. At this time he was a Glamorgan CC Academy, and ECB England National Development Squad player. The latter also included Alistair Cook, Ravi Bopara, Tim Bresnan and Samit Patel who would play Test cricket subsequently.

Amateur wins
2003 Boys Amateur Championship
2006 Scratch Players Championship
2003–07 ten collegiate championships
1999-2003 fourteen junior championships

Professional wins (5)

European Tour wins (1)

European Tour playoff record (0–1)

Challenge Tour wins (4)

Challenge Tour playoff record (1–1)

Playoff record
Asian Tour playoff record (0–1)

Results in major championships

Note: Davies never played in the Masters Tournament.

CUT = missed the half-way cut
"T" = tied

Results in World Golf Championships

"T" = Tied

Team appearances
Amateur
European Boys' Team Championship (representing Wales): 2002, 2003
Jacques Léglise Trophy (representing Great Britain and Ireland): 2002 (winners), 2003 (winners)
European Youths' Team Championship (representing Wales): 2004, 2006
Eisenhower Trophy (representing Wales): 2004, 2006
Palmer Cup (representing Europe): 2004 (winners), 2005, 2006 (winners), 2007
European Amateur Team Championship (representing Wales): 2005, 2007
Walker Cup (representing Great Britain and Ireland): 2005, 2007
St Andrews Trophy (representing Great Britain and Ireland): 2006 (winners)

Professional
Royal Trophy (representing Europe): 2011 (winners)
World Cup (representing Wales): 2011

See also
2009 Challenge Tour graduates
2015 Challenge Tour graduates
List of golfers with most Challenge Tour wins

References

External links

Welsh male golfers
East Tennessee State Buccaneers men's golfers
Asian Tour golfers
European Tour golfers
Golfers from Edinburgh
Sportspeople from Bridgend
1985 births
Living people